Google Lens is an image recognition technology developed by Google, designed to bring up relevant information related to objects it identifies using visual analysis based on a  neural network. First announced during Google I/O 2017, it was first provided as a standalone app, later being integrated into Android's standard camera app.

Features
When directing the phone's camera at an object, Google Lens will attempt to identify the object by reading barcodes, QR codes, labels and text, and show relevant search results, web pages, and information. For example, when pointing the device's camera at a Wi-Fi label containing the network name and password, it will automatically connect to the scanned Wi-Fi network. Lens is also integrated with the Google Photos and Google Assistant apps. The service is similar to Google Goggles, a previous app that functioned similarly but with less capability. Lens uses more advanced deep learning routines in order to empower detection capabilities, similar to other apps like Bixby Vision (for Samsung devices released after 2016) and Image Analysis Toolset also known as IAT (available on Google Play); 
During Google I/O 2019, Google announced four new features. The software will be able to recognize and recommend items on a menu. It will have the ability to also calculate tips and split bills, show how to prepare dishes from a recipe and can use text-to-speech.

Availability 

Google officially launched Google Lens on October 4, 2017, with app previews pre-installed into the Google Pixel 2., not yet widely available for other devices. In November 2017, the feature began rolling out into the Google Assistant for Pixel and Pixel 2 phones A preview of Lens has also been implemented into the Google Photos app for Pixel phones. On March 5, 2018, Google officially released Google Lens to Google Photos on non-Pixel phones. Support for Lens in the iOS version of Google Photos was made on March 15, 2018. Beginning in May 2018, Google Lens was made available within Google Assistant on OnePlus devices as well as being integrated into camera apps of various Android phones. A standalone Google Lens app was made available on Google Play in June 2018. Device support is limited, although it is not clear which devices are not supported or why. It requires Android Marshmallow (6.0) or newer. On December 10, 2018, Google rolled out the Lens visual search feature to the Google app for iOS. In 2022, Google Lens gradually replaced the reverse image search functionality of Google Images, first by replacing it in Google Chrome and later by making it officially available as a web application.

References

Lens
2017 software
Augmented reality